Maes may refer to:

People
 Maes, a surname (with a list of articles concerning the bearers)
 Maes (born 1995), a French rapper of Moroccan origin
 Maes Titianus, an ancient Roman traveler of Macedonian culture
 Maes Hughes, a fictional character in Hiromu Arakawa's manga and anime series Fullmetal Alchemist

Others
 Maes, usually the site of a Welsh eisteddfod
 Maes Knoll, an Iron Age hill fort in Somerset, England
 Alken-Maes, a Belgian brewery
 Maes pils, a Belgian beer brewed by Alken-Maes

 Society of Mexican American Engineers and Scientists (MAES)

See also
 Maesteg, a town and community in Wales
 Maas